Worksop Manor is a Grade I listed 18th-century country house in Bassetlaw, Nottinghamshire. It stands in one of the four contiguous estates in the Dukeries area of Nottinghamshire. Traditionally, the Lord of the Manor of Worksop may assist a British monarch at his or her coronation by providing a glove and putting it on the monarch's right hand and supporting his or her right arm. Worksop Manor was the seat of the ancient Lords of Worksop.

The house was an important English country house of the Talbot and Howard families between the 1580s and its destruction by fire in 1761; an even grander rebuilding was only partially completed, and after 1777 it was neglected and largely dismantled in the 1830s. 
 
The building as it is now, greatly reduced and rebuilt but still very large, is mostly 18th and 19th-century. It has 2 and 3 storeys of ashlar with hipped slate roofs, forming a quadrangle approximately 25 bays wide by 14 bays deep.

History

The Talbot family had owned Worksop Manor since the 14th century. Its manor house was for some time in 1568 the prison of Mary, Queen of Scots.

In the 1580s a new house was built on the site for the very wealthy George Talbot, 6th Earl of Shrewsbury, probably designed by Robert Smythson. It was a leading example of the Elizabethan prodigy house.  At the same time Smythson also designed the associated Worksop Manor Lodge which survived in substantially original form until 2007 when it was burnt down and it is currently being restored. The lodge, occupied by Roger Portington, keeper of the Worksop parks, was compared to the Medici villa at Pratolino.

The house was much admired, especially for its long gallery on the top storey, where one chimneypiece had the date "1585".  In 1607 there were rumours about the grandeur of a mansion that George Home, 1st Earl of Dunbar was building in the ruins of Berwick Castle. George Chaworth wrote to Gilbert Talbot, 7th Earl of Shrewsbury saying he heard the long gallery at Berwick would make that built by his father at Worksop look like a garret or attic.

Royal visits
Members of the Scottish royal family stayed at Worksop on their way to London after the Union of the Crowns. King James stayed at the main house in 1603 on his way south to take the throne of England. Anne of Denmark stayed in June 1603, travelling from the house of Edward Rye at Doncaster, and holding court at Worksop on the king's birthday, 19 June. A record of kitchen expenses mentions Polish and Bolognese sausages, Westphalia bacon, and two Frenchmen were employed to fold napkins. She gave William Cecil, the young son of Sir Robert Cecil, a jewel and tied it in his ear, and he danced with the 7 year old Princess Elizabeth. Anne of Denmark found time to write a letter in German to her brother Christian IV from Worksop, signing "im Pallast das Graffn von Schrosbery". Her large crowd of followers was disorderly, and the Duke of Lennox and the Earls of Shrewsbury and Cumberland made a proclamation at Worksop that her followers should put aside any private quarrels, and hangers-on without formal roles should leave.

In August 1604 Prince Charles stayed at Worksop when he travelled from Scotland. He was accompanied by Dr Henry Atkins who described four days of music, and young Duke of York's initiation into hunting, when deer were driven close to the house.

Rebuildings and replacement
At the end of the 17th century the house passed by marriage to the Duke of Norfolk, in whose family it would remain until 1840. In 1701 the 8th Duke of Norfolk doubled the size of the house, built stables and laid out large gardens. The 9th Duke also further improved the gardens. Mary Howard, Duchess of Norfolk had the house renovated but it burned down in 1761.

Later that year, James Paine was commissioned to build a replacement for the burnt-out Elizabethan mansion. He planned a roughly square mansion with a vast hall in the central courtyard which would have been one of the largest houses ever built in England, had it been completed. Only one wing had been finished when work stopped on the house in 1767, but even this was on a palatial scale. On the death of the 9th Duke in 1777, the estate passed to a distant cousin, aged 57 and living in Surrey. Neither he nor his immediate successors lived at Worksop and it became neglected. The 12th Duke gave it to his son, the Earl of Surrey, in 1815.

In 1838, the Earl of Surrey sold the estate to the Duke of Newcastle of nearby Clumber Park for £375,000, who ruthlessly stripped the house. He demolished the main wing of the house with gunpowder, having sold off the roof lead and some fittings, as he was only interested in adding the land to his own estate. In spite of the money received from salvage and timber he made a huge loss on the purchase which seems to have been animated by anti-Catholic sentiment, the Duke of Norfolk having been a leading Catholic aristocrat. After a number of years the surviving parts of the house, that is the stable, the service wing and part of the eastern end of the main range, were reformed into a new mansion (pictured here), which was leased for a number of years by Lord Foley and afterwards by William Isaac Cookson, a manufacturer of lead. In 1890 a large part of the estate was sold by auction; the house and adjoining parkland was bought by Sir John Robinson, a Nottingham businessman, who felled many of the mature trees for sale. He was appointed High Sheriff of Nottinghamshire in 1901.

Since at least 1890 the estate has been home to the Worksop Manor Stud, which breeds thoroughbred horses.

See also
Grade I listed buildings in Nottinghamshire
Listed buildings in Worksop

References

External links

 Account for the entertainment of Anna of Denmark at Worksop Manor, 1603, Lambeth Palace Library MS 694
 History of Worksop Manor at Worksop Heritage Trail 
 Worsop Manor in The Great Houses of Nottinghamshire and the County Families, by L Jacks (1881)
 Worsop Manor in Worksop, The Dukery and Sherwood Forest, by Robert White (1875)

The Dukeries
Grade I listed buildings in Nottinghamshire
Buildings and structures in Nottinghamshire
History of Nottinghamshire
Bassetlaw District
Worksop
Howard family (English aristocracy)